Wilfred Whitworth (third ¼ 1914  – death unknown) was an English professional rugby league footballer who played in the 1930s and 1940s.

Playing career
Wilfred Whitworth made his début for Wakefield Trinity during December 1936, he made his début for the Featherstone Rovers on Saturday 4 September 1943, he appears to have scored no drop-goals (or field-goals as they are currently known in Australasia), but prior to the 1974–75 season all goals, whether; conversions, penalties, or drop-goals, scored 2-points, consequently prior to this date drop-goals were often not explicitly documented, therefore '0' drop-goals may indicate drop-goals not recorded, rather than no drop-goals scored. In addition, prior to the 1949–50 season, the archaic field-goal was also still a valid means of scoring points.

Genealogical information
Wilfred Whitworth's marriage to Lucy (née Sutcliffe) was registered during second ¼ 1936 in Oldham district. They had children; Brian S. Whitworth (birth registered during first ¼ 1942 in Wakefield district).

References

External links
Search for "Whitworth" at rugbyleagueproject.org
Statistics at orl-heritagetrust.org.uk

1914 births
English rugby league players
Featherstone Rovers players
Oldham R.L.F.C. players
Place of death missing
Rugby league centres
Rugby league players from Oldham
Wakefield Trinity players
Year of death missing